Frank Petersen may refer to:

 Frank E. Petersen (1932–2015), first African-American U.S. Marine Corps aviator and general
 Frank S. Petersen (1922–2011), northern California jurist and politician

See also
 Frank Peterson (born 1963), German music producer